Reinaldo Paniagua Diez (July 20, 1934 – January 29, 2021) was a Puerto Rican politician who served as the seventh Puerto Rico Secretary of State from January 2, 1977, to 1979, under Governor Carlos Romero Barceló and served as acting Governor whenever the Governor was traveling. He had previously served as Romero-Barceló's campaign manager during the 1976 gubernatorial campaign.

Secretary Paniagua, born on July 20, 1934, and whose mother was Rita Diez and whose father was Reinaldo Paniagua, died on January 29, 2021, of natural causes.

Paniagua, nicknamed "Poto", acquired ownership of the Cangrejeros de Santurce baseball team in Puerto Rico's Liga de Béisbol Profesional Roberto Clemente winter league after resigning as Secretary of State and Lieutenant Governor in 1979, and retained it until 2002.

References

1935 births
2021 deaths
Members of the Senate of Puerto Rico
People from Santurce, Puerto Rico
Puerto Rican lawyers
Secretaries of State of Puerto Rico